Melnikova may refer to:

Angelina Melnikova (born 2000), Russian artistic gymnast
Anna Melnikova (born 1985), Russian female acrobatic gymnast
Anna Melnikova (volleyball) (born 1995), Russian female volleyball player
Antonina Melnikova (born 1958), Belarusian sprint canoer who competed for the Soviet Union
Darya Melnikova (born 1992), Russian actress of theater, film and television
Marina Melnikova (born 1989), Russian tennis player
Mariya Dolina-Melnikova (1922–2010), Pe-2 pilot and deputy squadron commander
Natalia Melnikova, Russian head coach in acrobatic gymnastics working in Moscow
Polina Melnikova (born 2001), Russian alpine skier
Svetlana Melnikova (born 1951), retired female discus thrower and shot putter
Tamara Melnikova (born 1940), Russian museum worker, teacher, literary scholar
Valentina Melnikova (born 1946), Russian human rights activist and politician
Varvara Melnikova (born 1980), Russian business executive and urban planner
Yelena Melnikova (born 1971), Russian former biathlete who competed in the 1992 Winter Olympics

See also
Melnikov
Melnikovka
Melnikovo
Mylnikov